Chiara Marisa Green (born 18 October 1993) is an English cricketer who currently plays for Sussex. She plays as a right-arm off break bowler. She has previously played for Southern Vipers.

Early life
Green was born on 18 October 1993 in Brighton, East Sussex.

Domestic career
Green made her county debut in 2010, for Sussex against Nottinghamshire, taking 2/18 from 8 overs. The following season, 2011, Green took 5 wickets at an average of 8.20 in the Twenty20 Cup, and took 2 wickets in the same competition the following season as Sussex won the competition. Green's strength continued to be T20 bowling over the following seasons, for example taking 7 wickets at an average of 13.74 in 2014, and helping her side to another Twenty20 Cup title in 2015.

Green had a strong season in 2018, taking 6 wickets at an average of 13.16 in the County Championship and  12 wickets, the most for her side, at an average of 7.83 in the Twenty20 Cup. In 2019, she took her T20 best bowling figures of 3/6 in a match against Warwickshire.

In August 2021, Green was added to the Southern Vipers squad, and made her debut for the side in a Charlotte Edwards Cup match against South East Stars, taking 1/25 from 3 overs. In 2022, she played eight matches for Sussex in the Women's Twenty20 Cup, taking four wickets.

References

External links

1993 births
Living people
Sportspeople from Brighton
Sussex women cricketers
Southern Vipers cricketers